Bagrat Khutaba (Russian: Баграт Хутаба; born 10 February 1982) is the Ambassador Extraordinary and Plenipotentiary of the Republic of Abkhazia to the Syrian Arab Republic and a retired freestyle wrestler and the current Chairman of the State Committee for Physical Culture and Sports of Abkhazia. Khutaba was appointed on 11 April 2015 by President Raul Khajimba — up until that point, Sports had been part of the Ministry for Education.

Bagrat is the son of Rashid Khutaba, a heavyweight freestyle wrestler who won the European title in 1982. Coached by his father, Bagrat won a bronze medal at the 2001 Junior World Championships. At the time he studied and trained in Moscow and competed for Russia. His younger brother Badzhgur is also an international heavyweight freestyle wrestler.

References

Living people
1982 births
Russian male sport wrestlers
Chairmen of the State Committee for Sports of Abkhazia
Place of birth missing (living people)

the Ambassador Extraordinary and Plenipotentiary of the Republic of Abkhazia to the Syrian Arab Republic on July 21,2020
https://syrianobserver.com/EN/news/59496/president-assad-receives-credentials-of-algerian-and-abkhazian-ambassadors.html
http://mfaapsny.org/en/allnews/news/othernews/bagrat-khutaba-vruchil-veritelnuyu-gramotu-validu-al-muallem/